The following radio stations broadcast on AM frequency 1280 kHz: 1280 AM is a regional North American broadcast frequency.

In Argentina
 LU11 in Trenque Lauquen, Buenos Aires

In Canada

In Mexico
 XEAW-AM in Monterrey, Nuevo León
 XECSAB-AM in Patzcuaro, Michoacan
 XECSAJ-AM in Tamazunchale, San Luis Potosi
 XEEG-AM in Puebla, Puebl
 XESMA-AM in San Miguel de Allende, Guanajuato
 XETUT-AM in Tula, Tamaulipas

In the United States

References

Lists of radio stations by frequency